Josefina Gabrielle (born October 1963) is a British stage and television actress, and a former ballet dancer, best known for her performances in West End musicals and plays.

Theatrical career
Gabrielle was born in London in October 1963 to a Spanish father and an English mother. She trained at the Arts Educational Schools, London and began her professional career dancing with the National Ballet of Portugal - CNB. Upon returning to Britain, she started a career in musical theatre, and has since appeared in numerous musical productions, in the West End and on Broadway.

In 1992, she was part of the ensemble in Nicholas Hytner's acclaimed revival of Rodgers and Hammerstein's Carousel. This production opened at the Royal National Theatre and transferred in 1993 to the Shaftesbury Theatre. Her other early roles include Iris in Fame at the Cambridge Theatre, Maggie in A Chorus Line at the Derby Playhouse and Cassie in a touring production of the same show, and Jenna in The Goodbye Girl at the Noël Coward Theatre.

She continued her association with Rodgers and Hammerstein in 1998 when she was chosen by director Trevor Nunn to star as Laurey Williams in his new production of Oklahoma! which was also staged at the National Theatre. It later transferred to the Lyceum Theatre in the West End. For her performance in Oklahoma!, Gabrielle received her first Olivier Award nomination for Best Actress in a Musical. She was the first Laurey in any production of Oklahoma! to dance her own "Dream Ballet," which was recreated especially for her by choreographer Susan Stroman. When this revival transferred to Broadway in 2002, Gabrielle travelled with the show and made her Broadway debut with the new company.

Gabrielle's other roles include Dot/Maria in Sunday in the Park With George at the Leicester Haymarket, Roxie Hart in Chicago at the Adelphi and Cambridge theatres, Alexandra Spofford in The Witches of Eastwick at the Prince of Wales Theatre, Cassie in A Chorus Line at Sheffield's Crucible Theatre, Kathy Selden in Singin' in the Rain at the Leicester Haymarket and Sadler's Wells theatres, Irene Molloy in the Open Air Theatre, Regent's Park production of Hello, Dolly!, opposite Samantha Spiro. In Sweet Charity, which played first at the Menier Chocolate Factory and transferred to the Theatre Royal, Haymarket in the West End, Gabrielle played the roles of Nickie and Ursula, and received another Olivier Award nomination for her performance. Later in 2010, she played Lady Jacqui in the Crucible Theatre's, Sheffield production of Me and My Girl. In 2012, she toured the UK in the role of Mrs. Anna Leonowens in a production of Rodgers and Hammerstein's The King and I, her third musical by this duo. Later that year, she returned to the Menier Chocolate Factory to play the role of Gussie Carnegie in Maria Friedman's much acclaimed production of Stephen Sondheim's musical Merrily We Roll Along, which had its West End transfer to the Harold Pinter Theatre in 2013 and earned Gabrielle her third Olivier Award nomination for her performance. In May 2014, she joined the new cast of Charlie and the Chocolate Factory the Musical at the Theatre Royal, Drury Lane, as Mrs. Teavee. In August and September 2017, Josefina took the lead role of Desirée in Sondheim's A Little Night Music at the Watermill Theatre, Newbury, performing the song "Send In The Clowns".
In 2018 she returned to Chicago when the production returned to the West End, to the Phoenix, this time playing the role of Velma Kelly. She played opposite the Roxie Harts of Sarah Soetart, Alexandra Burke and Caroline Flack. In 2020 Josefina played Madame Thenardier in Les Misérables when the ‘new’ version re-opened the refurbished Queen's Theatre under its new name of Sondheim Theatre. She is still performing this role as of October 2022.

Dramatic work
Gabrielle has appeared in various straight plays and comedies, including Noël Coward's Tonight at 8.30, a series of one act plays  ( Red Peppers, The Astonished Heart, Family Album, Hands Across the Sea, Fumed Oak and Shadow Play ) at Minerva Theatre, Chichester opposite Alexander Hanson in 2006, The 39 Steps at the Criterion Theatre in 2007/08, The Murder Game at the King's Head Theatre in 2009, Park Avenue Cat at the Arts Theatre in 2011 and Ray Cooney's Two into One at the Menier Chocolate Factory in 2014. In 2017, she took over the role of Mavis in Maria Friedman's revival of Richard Harris' play Stepping Out at the Vaudeville Theatre.

Film and television
Gabrielle's on screen credits include:
Miranda Hart
Doctors
Heartbeat as Debbie Bellamy/Black
Born and Bred as Jacqueline Williamson
Auf Wiedersehen, Pet as Ofelia
Sunburn as Receptionist
Oklahoma! as Laurey
The 56th Annual Tony Awards as herself
The Rosie O'Donnell Show as herself

Recordings
She can be heard on the London cast recordings of Oklahoma!, The Goodbye Girl, Fame and Carousel.

Awards and nominations
Laurence Olivier Awards

Clarence Derwent Awards Best Female in a Supporting Role 
Sweet Charity (2011) (winner)

Manchester Theatre Awards Best Actress in a Visiting Production
King and I (2012) (nominated)

Astaire Awards - Best Female Dancer
Oklahoma! (2002) (nominated)

Outer Critics Circle Award Outstanding Actress in a Musical
Oklahoma! (2001-2002) (nominated)

External links
Interview With Broadway.com
Broadway.com Profile

Twitter Josefina Gabrielle

1963 births
Living people
Actresses from London
British ballerinas
British stage actresses
British television actresses